A rape chant is a type of chant made by members of a group that condones rape and sexual assault.

History 

Historically rape chants have been associated with the acceptance of violence against women. Rape chants relate to a sociological concept called rape culture.  In the past chants have invoked violence against women, violence against children, paedophilia, political violence and even necrophilia.

This topic is not covered widely in textbooks or academic literature but was explored at length in a The Agenda with Steve Paikin segment in 2013. Carleton University associate professor Rena Bivens, has stated that both men and women are complicit in the rape culture that leads to these chants. Furthermore, she says these chants normalize rape culture.

Notable examples

Rape chants have occurred around the globe.

Africa 
Over 100 members of the youth wing of the ruling political party engaged rape chants in Burundi in 2017. These chants were subsequently condemned by the United Nations.

Americas 
In 2013 chants occurred at two Canadian universities. These incidents garnered significant media coverage in Canada. The first incident occurred on Labour Day when a group of Saint Marys University students participated in a chant during frosh-week. That same September, another incident occurred involving students from the University of British Columbia's prestigious Sauder School of Business. Students from the Commerce Undergraduate Society were recorded participating in these chants. Reforms were made following incidents at UBC and an investigation revealed  that such chants were part of an "oral tradition" possibly dating back at least 20 years.

In 2011 Delta Kappa Epsilon, a prominent fraternity at Yale University, was suspended following reports of a chant taking place.

Australia

A rape chant incident occurred on an Australian university campus in 2016.

Europe

In 2017 Jesus College, Cambridge, England disciplined students for allegedly shouting "woman-hating, rape-inciting chants". In 2022, a chant occurred at Complutense University, Madrid, Spain. The chants were criticised by Spanish Prime Minister Pedro Sánchez.

See also
Campus sexual assault

References

Further reading 
 Anderson, L. & Gonick, M. (2021). The Saint Mary’s Rape Chant: A Discourse Analysis of Media Coverage: Girlhood Studies, New York: 14 (1) pp. 52–67

Rape